{{Infobox venue
| stadium_name = Globe Life Field
| logo_image = Globe Life Field logo.svg
| logo_size = 
| image = Globelifefield june2020.jpg
| image_size = 300px
| caption = Globe Life Field in 2020
| location = 734 Stadium Dr. Arlington, Texas, U.S.
| coordinates = 
| pushpin_map = USA Texas#USA
| pushpin_relief = 1
| pushpin_map_caption = Location in Texas##Location in the United States
| broke_ground = 
| opened =   (high school graduation) (exhibition game) (regular season) (open to fans)
| operator = Texas Rangers
| surface = Shaw Sports B1K (Artificial Turf)
| construction_cost = $1.1 billion
| architect = HKS, Inc.VLK Architects
| structural engineer = Walter P Moore| services engineer = ME Engineers
| general_contractor = Construction Manager: Manhattan Construction Company
| tenants = Texas Rangers (MLB) 2020–present
| seating_capacity = 40,300
| suites = 120
| dimensions = Baseball:Left field: Left center: Center field: Right center: Right field: Backstop: 

| scoreboard = 111 feet wide and 40 feet tall
| capacity = 40,300
| main_contractors = Manhattan Construction Company
| fullname = Globe Life Field
| website = https://www.mlb.com/rangers/ballpark
| elevation = 
| centre_name = Globe Life Field
| name = Globe Life Field
| cost = $1.1 Billion USD
| acreage = 270
}}

Globe Life Field is a retractable roof stadium in Arlington, Texas. It is the home ballpark of Major League Baseball's Texas Rangers. It is located just south of Choctaw Stadium, the Rangers' former home ballpark.

History
Background
On May 20, 2016, the Rangers announced that they would vacate Globe Life Park. The new stadium was to be constructed in a public/private partnership and have a retractable roof. The ballpark was approved on the following Election Day. HKS, Inc. was announced as the architect on January 5, 2017.

On January 31, 2019, the Rangers announced that the playing surface of Globe Life Field would be carpeted with synthetic grass supplied by Shaw Sports Turf, making them one of only five major league teams to play their home games on artificial turf.

The Rangers cited weather as the reason why attendance at Globe Life Park was lower than in other baseball stadiums in major metropolitan areas, as the area is prone to high temperatures and frequent rain. Therefore, the Rangers proposed that their new ballpark should be constructed with a roof. Unlike its predecessors, the new stadium's center field faces northeast rather than southeast.

A new shopping mall, a Loews Hotel, and a ballpark village are planned to go along with the new stadium. Choctaw Stadium will then be renovated for football and soccer use.

The plans to build the stadium generated a mixed reaction. The new stadium offers a more comfortable environment to watch baseball but extended existing taxes used to pay for AT&T Stadium. According to The Dallas Morning News'', "The deal calls for the city to issue $500 million in bonds to help pay for the stadium. A half-cent of sales tax, 2% hotel occupancy tax and 5% car rental tax would pay off those bonds over an estimated 30 years. Voters also approved a ticket tax of up to 10% and parking tax of up to $3 at the new stadium. That money would be used for some of the Rangers' portion of the debt, which was criticized by the opposition campaign."

On December 14, 2019, a section of the roof caught fire while under construction.

Opening
Globe Life Field was originally scheduled to open on March 23, 2020, but because of the COVID-19 pandemic, the start of the 2020 Major League Baseball season was delayed for several months. Globe Life Field opened for a high-school graduation on May 29, 2020.

On July 24, 2020, the Rangers hosted their first regular-season game against the Colorado Rockies, which they won 1-0. The Rangers played two exhibition games against the Rockies on July 21 and 22 at Globe Life Field. Joey Gallo hit the first home run at the stadium on July 26.

2020 MLB postseason
Because of the COVID-19 pandemic, Major League Baseball announced on September 15, 2020 that it would implement a playoff "bubble" starting with the second round of the playoffs. Globe Life Field and Minute Maid Park in Houston shared the 2020 National League Division Series second-round playoff series, with one series in Houston and the other in Arlington. The 2020 National League Championship Series and the 2020 World Series were played exclusively at Globe Life Field. MLB allowed fans to attend games at Globe Life during the NLCS and World Series.

Naming rights
Globe Life and Accident Insurance Company owns the naming rights for the facility through 2048.

Dimensions
The marked dimensions of Globe Life Field pay extensive homage to Rangers history, honoring all of the team's retired numbers plus key seasons in team history.

Notable events

MLB
All 6 games of the 2020 World Series were held at Globe Life Field, making it the first and so far only venue to host a World Series without its tenant playing in the Series; this was due to the COVID-19 pandemic necessitating a neutral ground for the series.

National Finals Rodeo
The Professional Rodeo Cowboys Association held the 2020 National Finals Rodeo (NFR) at Globe Life Field instead of its usual location in Las Vegas due to the COVID-19 pandemic and Nevada's state-mandated health restrictions.

College football

On November 6, 2021, the ballpark hosted a college football game for the first time when Army and Air Force played in the Lockheed Martin Commanders' Classic. The Black Knights bested the Falcons, 21–14, in overtime. The day prior to the football game, the ballpark also hosted its first-ever boxing matches, with the boxing teams of each academy squaring off; Air Force won 6 bouts to 4. 

Globe Life Field's football configuration has the end zones at left field and first base.

Concerts

See also
 List of current Major League Baseball stadiums

References

External links
 Official Site

2020 establishments in Texas
American football venues in the Dallas–Fort Worth metroplex
Baseball venues in the Dallas–Fort Worth metroplex
Boxing venues in the United States
College football venues
Major League Baseball venues
Retractable-roof stadiums in the United States
Sports venues in Arlington, Texas
Sports venues completed in 2020
21st century in Arlington, Texas
Texas Rangers stadiums